Sirkazhi taluk is a taluk of Mayiladuthurai district of the Indian state of Tamil Nadu. The headquarters of the taluk is the town of Sirkazhi

Demographics
According to the 2011 census, the taluk of Sirkazhi had a population of 318,875 with 157,621  males and 161,254 females. There were 1023 women for every 1000 men. The taluk had a literacy rate of 73.67. Child population in the age group below 6 was 15,995 Males and 15,185 Females.

References 

Taluks of Mayiladuthurai district